Erythroxylum incrassatum is a species of plant in the Erythroxylaceae family. It is endemic to Jamaica.

References

incrassatum
Endemic flora of Jamaica
Taxonomy articles created by Polbot